Geukensia demissa is a species of mussel, a marine bivalve mollusk in the family Mytilidae, the true mussels. This species is native to the Atlantic coast of North America. The common names  for this species include ribbed mussel, Atlantic ribbed marsh mussel and ribbed horsemussel. However, the common name ribbed mussel is also used for the Southern Hemisphere mussel Aulacomya atra. The appearance of the shell is grooved and oval in shape. The interior of this mussel is tinted purple

The ribbed shells of this species usually attain a length of 10 cm length, and can be as large as 13 cm. Age can be determined by counting dark growth rings on the shell and mussels typically live 10 – 15 years, but more advanced ages are not uncommon.

Distribution
The ribbed mussel occurs in the coastal waters of salt marsh habitats from the southern Gulf of St. Lawrence in eastern Canada, south along the western Atlantic coast to Florida. In the Gulf of Mexico this species is replaced by the southern ribbed mussel, Geukensia granosissima, and the two species hybridize in southern Florida.

The ribbed mussel has been introduced to Texas, Mexico, California, and Venezuela.

Habitat

Ribbed mussels live in the intertidal zone, attached to hard surfaces or embedded in sediment with the help of their byssal threads. They are typically found in salt marshes where they form dense aggregations with the marsh cordgrass (Spartina alterniflora) and each other since aggregating near one another decreases an individual's chance of being preyed on.

Ribbed mussels are highly effected by small variations in temperature which makes their placement in the marsh important due to how variable temperature can be in salt marshes. Mussels that are in dense Spartina patches tended to be warmer than those who were not, and the amount of air flow that mussels receive can make a difference as well. Their position in the depth of the sediment also effects their internal body temperature.

Another example of how important microhabitats are for ribbed mussels is tidal height. In higher tidal zones, ribbed mussels do not grow to full potential and there are few out there; however, they tend to be live long and have a better chance of survival.

Ribbed mussels face more predation on marsh edges as well. Some of their predators include birds, raccoons, and blue crabs.

Reproduction
Ribbed mussels are dioecious and sexes can only be determined histologically.

They reproduce once per year in Connecticut and South Carolina, however in an introduced population in Venezuela two spawning peaks have been observed.

Mussels >15 mm are typically reproductive; however, it is not uncommon for mussels up to 35 mm to have no signs of gametogenesis. Their location in the salt marsh plays a role in when they become reproductive because edge ribbed mussels mature at smaller body sizes compared to other mussels.

Ribbed mussel larvae return to the marsh during recruitment, and they tend to settle near marsh edges where there are adult ribbed mussels.

Diet
The ribbed mussel is primarily a filter feeder, and they help to clean said area of bacteria, parasites, and heavy metals. They feed on phytoplankton, bacteria, and non flagellates to gain nutrients.

The speed at which ribbed mussels feed changes with temperature which is partially due to the availability of their food, and they feed more when their environment is warmer. Location also plays a role in filtration rates due to food quality and availability.

 Ecological Importance 
Ribbed mussels and other shellfish are able to store nutrients in the bodies and shells, through a process that may also remove toxins from the environment, and they can be used as bioindicators for certain pollutants like coliform bacteria. Ribbed mussels have been found with heavy metals in their tissues which suggests that they can filter such toxins out of the ecosystem. They also feed on algae, so they could be used to prevent harmful algal blooms.Spartina grasses benefit from the presence of mussels because ribbed mussels increase nutrients in sediment that Spartina need to grow. For example, mussels contribute bioavailable nitrogen in their pseudofeces. When ribbed mussels form mussel mounds, they are able to stabilize the ground to make it easier for Spartina'' to grow on.

Uses by Humans
Native Americans near the Jamestown settlement manufactured shell beads that were called "rawrenock" in the local Powhatan language. The production process involved grinding broken ribbed mussel shells into disk-shaped beads and drilling a central hole to string the jewelry with.  Surviving examples were recovered from the refuse that filled an abandoned well within the James Fort.

References

 Geukensia demissa (Dillwyn, 1817)  World Register of Marine Species (2012)
 Loren Coen and Keith Walters Ribbed Mussel Geukensia demissa South Carolina Department of Natural Resources
 http://www.sms.si.edu/irlspec/Geukensia_demissa.htm

Mytilidae
Bivalves described in 1817